Börje Svensson (born 1928) is a former Swedish trade union leader.

Born in Blekinge, Svensson began working as a cowhand, and also joined the Swedish Agricultural Workers' Union (SLF).  He was soon elected as the education officer of his local branch, and also undertook his own studies, which enabled him to become a foreman at some stables.  He went on to study labour movement relations, after which, the SLF nominated him to the Industrial Relations Board.

In 1967, Svensson became the full-time Working Environment Officer at the SLF headquarters.  In 1973, he was elected as president of the SLF, also serving on the executives of the Agricultural Credit Bank and that of the Swedish University of Agricultural Sciences.  In 1982, he was additionally elected as president of the International Federation of Plantation and Agricultural Workers (IFPAAW), then in 1988 he was elected as its full-time general secretary.  Under his leadership, IFPAAW merged into the International Union of Food and Allied Workers.

References

1928 births
Possibly living people
Swedish trade unionists